Hans-Josef "Jupp" Kapellmann (born 19 December 1949 in Bardenberg) is a former West German football player.

Shining for just promoted Alemannia Aachen in a Bundesliga runner-up season in 1969, midfielder Kapellmann left Aachen for 1. FC Köln a year later and after Aachen had been relegated from the Bundesliga. Kapellmann was a proven regular with 1. FC Köln until 1973, ending on second place in the Bundesliga and in the German Cup in 1973 with them. Subsequent to his in-form performances for his club he was snapped up by FC Bayern Munich with his new club paying Köln 802,000 Deutsche Mark (a Bundesliga record at that time) for Kapellmann's services. Rather used as defender later on, Kapellmann was part of the European Cup winner squads of Bayern in 1974, 1975 and also in 1976. He further won the Bundesliga in 1974 and the Intercontinental Cup in 1976 with Die Bayern, but played the last forty of his 338 Bundesliga matches (36 goals) for local rival TSV 1860 Munich.

For West Germany Jupp Kapellmann came to action in five games in between 1973 and 1974, but could not land himself a regular participation. In 1974, he was part of the host-nation-squad for the FIFA World Cup, watching his team lifting the trophy from his spot on the substitution bench.

Nowadays, Dr. Kapellmann is a doctor for Orthopedic surgery in the Bavarian town of Rosenheim.

Honours
Bundesliga: 1973–74
European Cup: 1973–74, 1974–75, 1975–76
World Cup: 1974
Intercontinental Cup: 1976
DFB-Pokal: Runner-up 1970–71, 1972–73

References

External links
 

1949 births
Living people
German footballers
Germany international footballers
Germany B international footballers
Germany under-21 international footballers
Germany youth international footballers
Association football forwards
Association football defenders
Alemannia Aachen players
1. FC Köln players
FC Bayern Munich footballers
TSV 1860 Munich players
FIFA World Cup-winning players
1974 FIFA World Cup players
Bundesliga players
Association football utility players
People from Würselen
Sportspeople from Cologne (region)
Footballers from North Rhine-Westphalia
UEFA Champions League winning players
German orthopedic surgeons
West German footballers